Tamarind (Tamarindus indica) is a leguminous tree bearing edible fruit that is indigenous to tropical Africa and naturalized in Asia. The genus Tamarindus is monotypic, meaning that it contains only this species. It belongs to the family Fabaceae.

The tamarind tree produces brown, pod-like fruits that contain a sweet, tangy pulp, which is used in cuisines around the world. The pulp is also used in traditional medicine and as a metal polish. The tree's wood can be used for woodworking and tamarind seed oil can be extracted from the seeds. Tamarind's tender young leaves are used in South Indian and Filipino cuisine. Because tamarind has multiple uses, it is cultivated around the world in tropical and subtropical zones.

Description 

The crown has an irregular, vase-shaped outline of dense foliage. The tree grows well in full sun. It prefers clay, loam, sandy, and acidic soil types, with a high resistance to drought and aerosol salt (wind-borne salt as found in coastal areas).

The evergreen leaves are alternately arranged and pinnately lobed. The branches droop from a single, central trunk as the tree matures, and are often pruned in agriculture to optimize tree density and ease of fruit harvest. At night, the leaflets close up.

As a tropical species, it is frost-sensitive. The pinnate leaves with opposite leaflets give a billowing effect in the wind. Tamarind timber consists of hard, dark red heartwood and softer, yellowish sapwood.

The tamarind flowers (although inconspicuously), with red and yellow elongated flowers. Flowers are 2.5 cm (1 in) wide, five-petalled, borne in small racemes, and yellow with orange or red streaks. Buds are pink as the four sepals are pink and are lost when the flower blooms.

Fruit 
The fruit is an indehiscent legume, sometimes called a pod,  in length, with a hard, brown shell.

The fruit has a fleshy, juicy, acidic pulp. It is mature when the flesh is coloured brown or reddish brown. The tamarinds of Asia have longer pods (containing six to 12 seeds), whereas African and West Indian varieties have shorter pods (containing one to six seeds). The seeds are somewhat flattened, and a glossy brown. The fruit is best described as sweet and sour in taste, and is high in tartaric acid, sugar, B vitamins, and, unusually for a fruit, calcium.

Taxonomy 
Tamarindus indica is probably indigenous to tropical Africa, but has been cultivated for so long on the Indian subcontinent that it is sometimes reported to be indigenous there. It grows wild in Africa in locales as diverse as Sudan,  Cameroon, Nigeria, Kenya, Zambia, Somalia, Tanzania and Malawi. In Arabia, it is found growing wild in Oman, especially Dhofar, where it grows on the sea-facing slopes of mountains. It reached South Asia likely through human transportation and cultivation several thousand years ago. It is widely distributed throughout the tropics, from Africa to South Asia.

In the 16th century, it was introduced to Mexico and Central America, and to a lesser degree to South America, by Spanish and Portuguese colonists, to the degree that it became a staple ingredient in the region's cuisine.

Today, India is the largest producer of tamarind. The consumption of tamarind is widespread due to its central role in the cuisines of the Indian subcontinent, Southeast Asia, and the Americas, especially Mexico.

Etymology 
Several early medieval herbalists and physicians wrote tamar indi, medieval Latin use was tamarindus, and Marco Polo wrote of tamarandi.

In Colombia, Costa Rica, Ecuador, Cuba, the Dominican Republic, Guatemala, El Salvador, Honduras, Mexico, Peru, Puerto Rico, Venezuela, Italy, Spain, and throughout the Lusosphere, it is called tamarindo. In those countries it is often used to make the beverage of the same name (or agua de tamarindo). In the Caribbean, tamarind is sometimes called tamón. 

Countries in the Malay world like Indonesia call it asam jawa (Javanese sour fruit) or simply asam, and sukaer in Timor. While in the Philippines, it is called sampalok or sampaloc  in Filipino, and sambag in Cebuano. Tamarind (Tamarindus indica) is sometimes confused with "Manila tamarind" (Pithecellobium dulce). While in the same taxonomic family Fabaceae, Manila tamarind is a different plant native to Mexico and known locally as guamúchili.

Cultivation 

Seeds can be scarified or briefly boiled to enhance germination. They retain their germination capability for several months if kept dry.

The tamarind has long been naturalized in Indonesia, Malaysia, Sri Lanka, the Philippines, the Caribbean, and Pacific Islands. Thailand has the largest plantations of the ASEAN nations, followed by Indonesia, Myanmar, and the Philippines. In parts of Southeast Asia, tamarind is called asam. It is cultivated all over India, especially in Maharashtra, Chhattisgarh, Karnataka, Telangana, Andhra Pradesh, and Tamil Nadu. Extensive tamarind orchards in India produce  annually.

In the United States, it is a large-scale crop introduced for commercial use (second in net production quantity only to India), mainly in southern states, notably south Florida, and as a shade tree, along roadsides, in dooryards and in parks.

A traditional food plant in Africa, tamarind has the potential to improve nutrition, boost food security, foster rural development and support sustainable landcare. In Madagascar, its fruit and leaves are a well-known favorite of the ring-tailed lemur, providing as much as 50 percent of their food resources during the year if available.

Horticulture
Throughout South Asia and the tropical world, tamarind trees are used as ornamental, garden, and cash crop plantings. Commonly used as a bonsai species in many Asian countries, it is also grown as an indoor bonsai in temperate parts of the world.

Uses 

The fruit is harvested by pulling the pod from its stalk. Veneer grafting, shield (T or inverted T) budding, and air layering may be used to propagate desirable cultivars. Such trees will usually fruit within three to four years if provided optimum growing conditions.

The fruit pulp is edible. The hard green pulp of a young fruit is considered by many to be too sour, but is often used as a component of savory dishes, as a pickling agent or as a means of making certain poisonous yams in Ghana safe for human consumption. As the fruit matures it becomes sweeter and less sour (acidic) and the ripened fruit is considered more palatable. The sourness varies between cultivars and some sweet tamarind ones have almost no acidity when ripe. In Western cuisine, tamarind pulp is found in Worcestershire sauce and HP Sauce.

Tamarind paste has many culinary uses including as a flavoring for chutneys, curries, and the traditional sharbat syrup drink. Tamarind sweet chutney is popular in India and Pakistan as a dressing for many snacks and often served with samosa. Tamarind pulp is a key ingredient in flavoring curries and rice in south Indian cuisine, in the Chigali lollipop, in rasam, and in certain varieties of masala chai tea. Across the Middle East, from the Levant to Iran, tamarind is used in savory dishes, notably meat-based stews, and often combined with dried fruits to achieve a sweet-sour tang. In the Philippines, the whole fruit is used as an ingredient in the traditional dish called sinigang to add a unique sour taste, unlike that of dishes that use vinegar instead. Indonesia also has a similarly sour, tamarind-based soup dish called sayur asem. 

Tamarind pulp mixed with liquid is also used in beverage as tamarind juice. In Java, Indonesia, tamarind juice is known as es asem or gula asem, tamarind juice served with palm sugar and ice as a fresh sour and sweet beverage.

In Mexico and the Caribbean, the pulp is diluted with water and sugared to make an agua fresca drink. It is widely used throughout all of México for candy making, including tamarind mixed with chilli powder candy.

In Sokoto, Nigeria, tamarind pulp is used to fix the color in dyed leather products by neutralizing the alkali substances used in tanning. 

The leaves and bark are also edible, and the seeds can be cooked to make safe for consumption. Blanched, tender tamarind leaves are used in a Burmese salad called magyi ywet thoke, a salad from Upper Myanmar that features tender blanched tamarind leaves, garlic, onions, roasted peanuts, and pounded dried shrimp.

Seed oil and kernel powder
Tamarind seed oil is the oil made from the kernel of tamarind seeds. The kernel is difficult to isolate from its thin but tough shell (or testa). It has a similar consistency to linseed oil, it used to make paint or varnish.

Tamarind kernel powder is used as sizing material for textile and jute processing, and in the manufacture of industrial gums and adhesives. It is de-oiled to stabilize its colour and odor on storage.

Folk medicine
Throughout Southeast Asia, the fruit of the tamarind is used as a poultice applied to the foreheads of people with fevers. The fruit exhibits laxative effects due to its high quantities of malic acid, tartaric acid, and potassium bitartrate. Its use for the relief of constipation has been documented throughout the world. Extract of steamed and sun-dried old tamarind pulp in Java (asem kawa) are used to treat skin problems like rashes and irritation; it can also be ingested after dilution as an abortifacient.

Woodworking
Tamarind wood is used to make furniture, boats (as per Rumphius) carvings, turned objects such as mortars and pestles, chopping blocks, and other small specialty wood items like krises. Tamarind heartwood is reddish brown, sometimes with a purplish hue. The heartwood in tamarind tends to be narrow and is usually only present in older and larger trees. The pale yellow sapwood is sharply demarcated from the heartwood. Heartwood is said to be durable to very durable in decay resistance, and is also resistant to insects. Its sapwood is not durable and is prone to attack by insects and fungi as well as spalting. Due to its density and interlocked grain, tamarind is considered difficult to work. Heartwood has a pronounced blunting effect on cutting edges. Tamarind turns, glues, and finishes well. The heartwood is able to take a high natural polish.

Metal polish
In homes and temples, especially in Buddhist Asian countries, the fruit pulp is used to polish brass shrine statues and lamps, and copper, brass, and bronze utensils. Tamarind contains tartaric acid, a weak acid that can remove tarnish. Lime, another acidic fruit, is used similarly.

Research
In hens, tamarind has been found to lower cholesterol in their serum, and in the yolks of the eggs they laid. Due to a lack of available human clinical trials, there is insufficient evidence to recommend tamarind for the treatment of hypercholesterolemia or diabetes. Different parts of tamarind (T. indica) are recognized for their various medicinal properties. A previous study reported that the seed, leaf, leaf veins, fruit pulp and skin extracts of tamarind possessed high phenolic content and antioxidant activities. The presence of lupanone and lupeol, catechin, epicatechin, quercetin and isorhamnetin in the leaf extract could have contributed towards the diverse range of the medicinal activities. 

On the other hand, ultra-high performance liquid chromatography (UHPLC) analyses revealed that tamarind seeds contained catechin, procyanidin B2, caffeic acid, ferulic acid, chloramphenicol, myricetin, morin, quercetin, apigenin and kaempferol. The treatment of tamarind leaves on liver HepG2 cells significantly regulated the expression of genes and proteins involved with consequential impact on the coagulation system, cholesterol biosynthesis, xenobiotic metabolism signaling and antimicrobial response.

References

External links

 SEA Hand Book-2009: Published by The Solvent Extractors' Association of India
 Tamarindus indica in Brunken, U., Schmidt, M., Dressler, S., Janssen, T., Thiombiano, A. & Zizka, G. 2008. West African plants – A Photo Guide.
 
 

Detarioideae
Fruits originating in Africa
Edible legumes
Medicinal plants
Sour fruits
Tropical fruit
Spices
Indian spices
Trees of Africa
Non-timber forest products
Plants described in 1753